The Belleville Nuclear Power Plant is located in Belleville-sur-Loire (Cher) near Léré, along the river Loire between Nevers ( upstream) and Orléans (  downstream).  It employs approximately 620 people and consists of two large 1,300 MW P4 nuclear reactors.  Its cooling water comes from the Loire River.

Key information

The site spans 170 hectares and is located on a flood-safe, 4.6-meter-high platform. Each year it produces an average of 19 billion kilowatt hours fed to the electricity grid, and thus covers about four percent of French electricity production.

With the construction of the first reactor was started on 1 May 1980, and it began operation 14 October 1987.  The second unit started construction 1 August 1980 and began operation 6 July 1988.  The shutdown of the reactors is planned for the years 2028 and 2029 for unit 1 and 2 respectively.

Safety

In May 2001 construction-related defects were observed in this plant, along with four other sites.

The emergency cooling system of the two-phase nuclear power plant has a reserve water tank at the bottom of the reactor building.  In the event of a defect in the primary cooling circuit that causes it to no longer contribute to cooling, the water from the reserve tank is automatically fed into the cooling system. Inspections in May 2001 showed, however, that this automatic feeding of the water was unreliable, because under some circumstances the pressure of the heated water may block the water slide.

The French nuclear regulatory authority ASN initially classified this disruption of the emergency cooling systems as stage 1 on the international scale of nuclear events (INES), but later assigned it the stage 2 classification. The operating company EDF then built the slider so that excess pressure can no longer lead to a blockage.

In 2017 the French nuclear regulator Autorité de sûreté nucléaire (ASN) placed Belleville under increased supervision because of "several failures by the operator in identifying and analysing the consequences of anomalies affecting certain safety-critical equipment". Belleville  has had eight Level 1 events on the International Nuclear Event Scale.

On 2 December 2021, the International Atomic Energy Agency (IAEA)'s Operational Safety Review Team (OSART), concluded an 18-day mission to Belleville and concluded the plant's operators had demonstrated a commitment to safety by introducing additional methods to prepare for accident management and using innovative approaches in the training of plant staff. OSART also identified areas for further enhancement, for example in operation, maintenance and operating experience. The mission was carried out at the request of the Government of France.

References

External links

 EDF site operator Belleville
 Centrale de Belleville - site de l'ASN Central Belleville - site of the ASN
 History of Central Belleville by the "green of Burgundy"
 Vue satellite sur Wikimapia : WikiMapia satellite view: The power of Belleville-sur-Loire
 Belleville 1 : INSC
 Belleville 2 : INSC
 Rapport 2007 Report 2007 under the Law of 13 June 2006 on transparency and nuclear safety

Nuclear power stations in France